The Falcău is a left tributary of the river Suceava. Its source is located in the municipality of Dolishniy Shepit in Vyzhnytsia Raion, Ukraine. The river then crosses the border into Romania, joining the Suceava near the village of Falcău.

References

Rivers of Romania
Rivers of Suceava County
Rivers of Chernivtsi Oblast